Piumi Hansamali Gomez (born 22 November 1992 as ), is a Sri Lankan actress, television personality, beauty pageant contestant, and model. She appeared in the serial Rithu, and films Wassanaye Sanda and Lucknow.

Early life and education
Hansamali was born in Negambo, the only child of Nihal Lakshman Gomez and Wasanthi Perera. Both her parents worked abroad. She completed her education at Sri Sobitha Vidyalaya, Rajagiriya. In 2011, she joined Side Images Modeling School conducted by Rozanne Diasz.

Career
Hansamali started her career in Ramp Modelling. In 2014, Hansamali made her television debut with the television serial Rithu telecast in ITN directed by Shantha Soyza. In the serial, she played the lead titular role opposite to popular actor Vishwa Kodikara. Even though the serial became popular, it was cancelled at the beginning of 2015 due to political pressure. 

In 2015, she participated in Mrs Globe and then in 2016, contested in Mrs. Noble Queen of the Universe held in Malaysia. In 2017, she competed in Best Model in Asia in Future Fashion Faces World held in Turkey.

Then in 2018, she made her maiden cinematic appearance with the drama film Wassanaye Sanda directed by Udayakantha Warnasuriya. In the film, she played the lead character of 'Mihiri'. In 2019, she was invited to act in Malayalam cinema Lucknow directed by Anil Kumar. In the film, she played the lead role alongside Sri Lankan dramatist, Jackson Anthony. This is the second time that a Sri Lankan actress has been in such a position since Yashoda Wimaladharma played the lead role in an Indian film in 1992.

Apart from acting, she also worked as a television presenter for the musical programme Music Live from 2014 to 2016. She has appeared in several television commercials including "Sunlight," "TVS Bikes," "Fortune Cooking Oil", and Hacks".

Personal life 
Hansamali was married and has a son.

Filmography

Selected music video appearances
 Omari Latha by Dushyanth Weeraman
 Saraviye by Eranga Lanka
 Modha by Shan Hasim
 Thahanam by Arshula Cooray
 Denuna by Sahan / Kaizer
 Vaishyaviyakda Ma by Amila Perera and Amila Nadeeshani

References

External links
 

1992 births
Living people
Sinhalese actresses
Sri Lankan television actresses
Sri Lankan female models
People from Colombo District